John Birks "Dizzy" Gillespie (October 21, 1917 – January 6, 1993) was an American jazz trumpeter, bandleader, composer, educator and singer. He was a trumpet virtuoso and improviser, building on the virtuosic style of Roy Eldridge but adding layers of harmonic and rhythmic complexity previously unheard in jazz. His combination of musicianship, showmanship, and wit made him a leading popularizer of the new music called bebop. His beret and horn-rimmed spectacles, scat singing, bent horn, pouched cheeks, and light-hearted personality provided one of bebop's most prominent symbols.

In the 1940s, Gillespie, with Charlie Parker, became a major figure in the development of bebop and modern jazz. He taught and influenced many other musicians, including trumpeters Miles Davis, Jon Faddis, Fats Navarro, Clifford Brown, Arturo Sandoval, Lee Morgan, Chuck Mangione, and balladeer Johnny Hartman.

He pioneered Afro-Cuban jazz and won several Grammy Awards. Scott Yanow wrote, "Dizzy Gillespie's contributions to jazz were huge. One of the greatest jazz trumpeters of all time, Gillespie was such a complex player that his contemporaries ended up being similar to those of Miles Davis and Fats Navarro instead, and it was not until Jon Faddis's emergence in the 1970s that Dizzy's style was successfully recreated [....] Gillespie is remembered, by both critics and fans alike, as one of the greatest jazz trumpeters of all time".

Biography

Early life and career
The youngest of nine children of Lottie and James Gillespie, Dizzy Gillespie was born in Cheraw, South Carolina. His father was a local bandleader, so instruments were made available to the children. Gillespie started to play the piano at the age of four. Gillespie's father died when he was only ten years old. He taught himself how to play the trombone as well as the trumpet by the age of twelve. From the night he heard his idol, Roy Eldridge, on the radio, he dreamed of becoming a jazz musician.

He won a music scholarship to the Laurinburg Institute in North Carolina which he attended for two years before accompanying his family when they moved to Philadelphia in 1935.

Gillespie's first professional job was with the Frank Fairfax Orchestra in 1935, after which he joined the respective orchestras of Edgar Hayes and later Teddy Hill, replacing Frankie Newton as second trumpet in May 1937. Teddy Hill's band was where Gillespie made his first recording, "King Porter Stomp". In August 1937 while gigging with Hayes in Washington D.C., Gillespie met a young dancer named Lorraine Willis who worked a Baltimore–Philadelphia–New York City circuit which included the Apollo Theater. Willis was not immediately friendly but Gillespie was attracted anyway. The two married on May 9, 1940.

Gillespie stayed with Teddy Hill's band for a year, then left and freelanced with other bands. In 1939, with the help of Willis, Gillespie joined Cab Calloway's orchestra. He recorded one of his earliest compositions, "Pickin' the Cabbage", with Calloway in 1940. After an altercation between the two, Calloway fired Gillespie in late 1941. The incident is recounted by Gillespie and Calloway's band members Milt Hinton and Jonah Jones in Jean Bach's 1997 film, The Spitball Story. Calloway disapproved of Gillespie's mischievous humor and his adventuresome approach to soloing. According to Jones, Calloway referred to it as "Chinese music". During rehearsal, someone in the band threw a spitball. Already in a foul mood, Calloway blamed Gillespie, who refused to take the blame. Gillespie stabbed Calloway in the leg with a knife. Calloway had minor cuts on the thigh and wrist. After the two were separated, Calloway fired Gillespie. A few days later, Gillespie tried to apologize to Calloway, but he was dismissed.

During his time in Calloway's band, Gillespie started writing big band music for Woody Herman and Jimmy Dorsey. He then freelanced with a few bands, most notably Ella Fitzgerald's orchestra, composed of members of the Chick Webb's band.

Gillespie did not serve in World War II. At his Selective Service interview, he told the local board, "in this stage of my life here in the United States whose foot has been in my ass?" and "So if you put me out there with a gun in my hand and tell me to shoot at the enemy, I'm liable to create a case of 'mistaken identity' of who I might shoot." He was classified 4-F. In 1943, he joined the Earl Hines band. Composer Gunther Schuller said,

 ... In 1943 I heard the great Earl Hines band which had Bird in it and all those other great musicians. They were playing all the flatted fifth chords and all the modern harmonies and substitutions and Gillespie runs in the trumpet section work. Two years later I read that that was 'bop' and the beginning of modern jazz ... but the band never made recordings.

Gillespie said of the Hines band, "[p]eople talk about the Hines band being 'the incubator of bop' and the leading exponents of that music ended up in the Hines band. But people also have the erroneous impression that the music was new. It was not. The music evolved from what went before. It was the same basic music. The difference was in how you got from here to here to here ... naturally each age has got its own shit."

Gillespie joined the big band of Hines' long-time collaborator Billy Eckstine, and it was as a member of Eckstine's band that he was reunited with Charlie Parker, a fellow member. In 1945, Gillespie left Eckstine's band because he wanted to play with a small combo. A "small combo" typically comprised no more than five musicians, playing the trumpet, saxophone, piano, bass and drums.

Rise of bebop

Bebop was known as the first modern jazz style. However, it was unpopular in the beginning and was not viewed as positively as swing music was. Bebop was seen as an outgrowth of swing, not a revolution. Swing introduced a diversity of new musicians in the bebop era like Charlie Parker, Thelonious Monk, Bud Powell, Kenny Clarke, Oscar Pettiford, and Gillespie. Through these musicians, a new vocabulary of musical phrases was created. With Parker, Gillespie jammed at famous jazz clubs like Minton's Playhouse and Monroe's Uptown House. Parker's system also held methods of adding chords to existing chord progressions and implying additional chords within the improvised lines

Gillespie compositions like "Groovin' High", "Woody 'n' You", and "Salt Peanuts" sounded radically different, harmonically and rhythmically, from the swing music popular at the time. "A Night in Tunisia", written in 1942, while he was playing with Earl Hines' band, is noted for having a feature that is common in today's music: a syncopated bass line. "Woody 'n' You" was recorded in a session led by Coleman Hawkins with Gillespie as a featured sideman on February 16, 1944 (Apollo), the first formal recording of bebop. He appeared in recordings by the Billy Eckstine band and started recording prolifically as a leader and sideman in early 1945. He was not content to let bebop sit in a niche of small groups in small clubs. A concert by one of his small groups in New York's Town Hall on June 22, 1945 presented bebop to a broad audience; recordings of it were released in 2005. He started to organize big bands in late 1945. Dizzy Gillespie and his Bebop Six, which included Parker, started an extended gig at Billy Berg's club in Los Angeles in December 1945. Reception was mixed and the band broke up. In February 1946 he signed a contract with Bluebird, gaining the distribution power of RCA for his music. He and his big band headlined the 1946 film Jivin' in Be-Bop.

After his work with Parker, Gillespie led other small combos (including ones with Milt Jackson, John Coltrane, Lalo Schifrin, Ray Brown, Kenny Clarke, James Moody, J.J. Johnson, and Yusef Lateef) and put together his successful big bands starting in 1947. He and his big bands, with arrangements provided by Tadd Dameron, Gil Fuller, and George Russell, popularized bebop and made him a symbol of the new music.

His big bands of the late 1940s also featured Cuban rumberos Chano Pozo and Sabu Martinez, sparking interest in Afro-Cuban jazz. He appeared frequently as a soloist with Norman Granz's Jazz at the Philharmonic.

Gillespie and his Bee Bop Orchestra was the featured star of the 4th Cavalcade of Jazz concert held at Wrigley Field in Los Angeles which was produced by Leon Hefflin, Sr. on September 12, 1948. The young maestro had recently returned from Europe where his music rocked the continent.  The program description noted "the musicianship, inventive technique, and daring of this young man has created a new style, which can be defined as off the chord solo gymnastics."  Also on the program that day were Frankie Laine, Little Miss Cornshucks, The Sweethearts of Rhythm, The Honeydrippers, Big Joe Turner, Jimmy Witherspoon, The Blenders, and The Sensations.

In 1948, Gillespie was involved in a traffic accident when the bicycle he was riding was bumped by an automobile. He was slightly injured and found that he could no longer hit the B-flat above high C. He won the case, but the jury awarded him only $1000 in view of his high earnings up to that point.

In 1951, Gillespie founded his record label, Dee Gee Records; it closed in 1953.

On January 6, 1953, he threw a party for his wife Lorraine at Snookie's, a club in Manhattan, where his trumpet's bell got bent upward in an accident, but he liked the sound so much he had a special trumpet made with a 45 degree raised bell, becoming his trademark.

In 1956 Gillespie organized a band to go on a State Department tour of the Middle East which was well-received internationally and earned him the nickname "the Ambassador of Jazz". During this time, he also continued to lead a big band that performed throughout the United States and featured musicians including Pee Wee Moore and others. This band recorded a live album at the 1957 Newport jazz festival that featured Mary Lou Williams as a guest artist on piano.

Afro-Cuban jazz
In the late 1940s, Gillespie was involved in the movement called Afro-Cuban music, bringing Afro-Latin American music and elements to greater prominence in jazz and even pop music, particularly salsa. Afro-Cuban jazz is based on traditional Afro-Cuban rhythms. Gillespie was introduced to Chano Pozo in 1947 by Mario Bauza, a Latin jazz trumpet player. Chano Pozo became Gillespie's conga drummer for his band. Gillespie also worked with Mario Bauza in New York jazz clubs on 52nd Street and several famous dance clubs such as the Palladium and the Apollo Theater in Harlem. They played together in the Chick Webb band and Cab Calloway's band, where Gillespie and Bauza became lifelong friends. Gillespie helped develop and mature the Afro-Cuban jazz style. Afro-Cuban jazz was considered bebop-oriented, and some musicians classified it as a modern style. Afro-Cuban jazz was successful because it never decreased in popularity and it always attracted people to dance.

Gillespie's most famous contributions to Afro-Cuban music are "Manteca" and "Tin Tin Deo" (both co-written with Chano Pozo); he was responsible for commissioning George Russell's "Cubano Be, Cubano Bop", which featured Pozo. In 1977, Gillespie met Arturo Sandoval during a jazz cruise to Havana.  Sandoval toured with Gillespie and defected in Rome in 1990 while touring with Gillespie and the United Nations Orchestra.

Final years

In the 1980s, Gillespie led the United Nations Orchestra. For three years Flora Purim toured with the Orchestra. She credits Gillespie with improving her understanding of jazz.

In 1982, he was sought out by Motown musician Stevie Wonder to play his solo in Wonder's 1982 hit single, "Do I Do".

He starred in the film The Winter in Lisbon that was released as El invierno en Lisboa in 1992 and re-released in 2004. The soundtrack album, featuring him, was recorded in 1990 and released in 1991. The film is a crime drama about a jazz pianist who falls for a dangerous woman while in Portugal with an American expatriate's jazz band.

In December 1991, during an engagement at Kimball's East in Emeryville, California, he suffered a crisis from what turned out to be pancreatic cancer. He performed one more night but cancelled the rest of the tour for medical reasons, ending his 56-year touring career. He led his last recording session on January 25, 1992.

On November 26, 1992, Carnegie Hall, following the Second Baháʼí World Congress, celebrated Gillespie's 75th birthday concert and his offering to the celebration of the centenary of the passing of Baháʼu'lláh. Gillespie was to appear at Carnegie Hall for the 33rd time. The line-up included Jon Faddis, James Moody, Paquito D'Rivera, and the Mike Longo Trio with Ben Brown on bass and Mickey Roker on drums. Gillespie was too unwell to attend. "But the musicians played their real hearts out for him, no doubt suspecting that he would not play again. Each musician gave tribute to their friend, this great soul and innovator in the world of jazz."

Death and postmortem 
A longtime resident of Englewood, New Jersey, Gillespie died of pancreatic cancer on January 6, 1993, at the age of 75 and was buried in Flushing Cemetery, Queens, New York City. Mike Longo delivered a eulogy at his funeral.

Politics and religion
In 1962, Gillespie and actor George Mathews starred in The Hole, an animated short film by John and Faith Hubley. Released the same year as the Cuban Missile Crisis, it uses audio from an improvised conversation between the two debating the causes of accidents and the possibility of accidentally launching nuclear weapons. The short went on to win the Academy Award for Best Animated Short Film the following year.

During the 1964 United States presidential campaign, Gillespie put himself forward as an independent write-in candidate. He promised that if he were elected, the White House would be renamed the Blues House, and he would have a cabinet composed of Duke Ellington (Secretary of State), Miles Davis (Director of the CIA), Max Roach (Secretary of Defense), Charles Mingus (Secretary of Peace), Ray Charles (Librarian of Congress), Louis Armstrong (Secretary of Agriculture), Mary Lou Williams (Ambassador to the Vatican), Thelonious Monk (Travelling Ambassador) and Malcolm X (Attorney General). He said his running mate would be Phyllis Diller. Campaign buttons had been manufactured years before by Gillespie's booking agency as a joke but proceeds went to Congress of Racial Equality, Southern Christian Leadership Conference and Martin Luther King Jr.; in later years they became a collector's item. In 1971, he announced he would run again but withdrew before the election.

Shortly after the death of Charlie Parker, Gillespie encountered an audience member after a show. They had a conversation about the oneness of humanity and the elimination of racism from the perspective of the Baháʼí Faith. Impacted by the assassination of Martin Luther King Jr. in 1968, he became a Baháʼí that same year. The universalist emphasis of his religion prodded him to see himself more as a global citizen and humanitarian, expanding on his interest in his African heritage. His spirituality brought out generosity and what author Nat Hentoff called an inner strength, discipline, and "soul force".

Gillespie's conversion was most affected by Bill Sears' book Thief in the Night. Gillespie spoke about the Baháʼí Faith frequently on his trips abroad. He is honored with weekly jazz sessions at the New York Baháʼí Center in the memorial auditorium.

Personal life 
Gillespie married dancer Lorraine Willis in Boston on May 9, 1940. They remained together until his death in 1993; Lorraine converted to Catholicism with Mary Lou Williams in 1957. Lorraine managed his business and personal affairs. The couple had no children, but Gillespie fathered a daughter, jazz singer Jeanie Bryson, born in 1958 from an affair with songwriter Connie Bryson. Gillespie met Bryson, a Juilliard-trained pianist, at the jazz club Birdland in New York City. In the mid-1960s, Gillespie settled down in Englewood, New Jersey, with his wife. The local Englewood public high school, Dwight Morrow High School, named its auditorium after him: the 'Dizzy Gillespie Auditorium'.

Artistry

Style
Gillespie has been described as the "sound of surprise". The Rough Guide to Jazz describes his musical style:

In Gillespie's obituary, Peter Watrous describes his performance style:

Wynton Marsalis summarized Gillespie as a player and teacher:

Bent trumpet

Gillespie's trademark trumpet featured a bell which bent upward at a 45-degree angle rather than pointing straight ahead as in the conventional design. According to Gillespie's autobiography, this was originally the result of accidental damage caused by the dancers Stump and Stumpy falling onto the instrument while it was on a trumpet stand on stage at Snookie's in Manhattan on January 6, 1953, during a birthday party for Gillespie's wife Lorraine. The constriction caused by the bending altered the tone of the instrument, and Gillespie liked the effect. He had the trumpet straightened out the next day, but he could not forget the tone. Gillespie sent a request to Martin to make him a "bent" trumpet from a sketch produced by Lorraine, and from that time forward played a trumpet with an upturned bell.

By June 1954 he was using a professionally manufactured horn of this design, and it was to become a trademark for the rest of his life. Such trumpets were made for him by Martin (from 1954), King Musical Instruments (from 1972) and Renold Schilke (from 1982, a gift from Jon Faddis). Gillespie favored mouthpieces made by Al Cass. In December 1986 Gillespie gave the National Museum of American History his 1972 King "Silver Flair" trumpet with a Cass mouthpiece.

In April 1995, Gillespie's Martin trumpet was auctioned at Christie's in New York City with instruments used by Coleman Hawkins, Jimi Hendrix, and Elvis Presley. An image of Gillespie's trumpet was selected for the cover of the auction program. The battered instrument was sold to Manhattan builder Jeffery Brown for $63,000, the proceeds benefiting jazz musicians with cancer.

Awards and honors

In 1989, Gillespie was given the Grammy Lifetime Achievement Award. The next year, at the Kennedy Center for the Performing Arts ceremonies celebrating the centennial of American jazz, Gillespie received the Kennedy Center Honors Award and the American Society of Composers, Authors, and Publishers Duke Ellington Award for 50 years of achievement as a composer, performer, and bandleader.

In 1989, Gillespie was awarded with an honorary doctorate of music from Berklee College of Music.

In 1991, Gillespie received the Golden Plate Award of the American Academy of Achievement presented by Awards Council member Wynton Marsalis.

In 1993 he received the Polar Music Prize in Sweden. In 2002, he was posthumously inducted into the International Latin Music Hall of Fame for his contributions to Afro-Cuban music. He was honored on December 31, 2006 in A Jazz New Year's Eve: Freddy Cole & the Dizzy Gillespie All-Star Big Band at The John F. Kennedy Center for the Performing Arts. In 2014, Gillespie was inducted into the New Jersey Hall of Fame.

In popular culture
Samuel E. Wright played Dizzy Gillespie in the film Bird (1988), about Charlie Parker. Kevin Hanchard portrayed Gillespie in the Chet Baker biopic Born to Be Blue (2015). Charles S. Dutton played him in For Love or Country: The Arturo Sandoval Story (2000).

List of works

References

External links

 The Dizzy Gillespie Bands
 Interview with Les Tomkins in 1973
 Articles at NPR Music
 Short biography by C.J Shearn

 

1917 births
1993 deaths
Commandeurs of the Ordre des Arts et des Lettres
Grammy Lifetime Achievement Award winners
Kennedy Center honorees
United States National Medal of Arts recipients
African-American jazz composers
African-American jazz musicians
Afro-Cuban jazz bandleaders
Afro-Cuban jazz composers
Afro-Cuban jazz trumpeters
American jazz bandleaders
American jazz composers
American jazz trumpeters
American male trumpeters
American male jazz composers
Bebop trumpeters
Big band bandleaders
Latin jazz bandleaders
Latin jazz composers
Latin jazz trumpeters
Capitol Records artists
Manor Records artists
Musicraft Records artists
Prestige Records artists
RCA Victor artists
Savoy Records artists
Verve Records artists
American Bahá'ís
African-American Bahá'ís
Converts to the Bahá'í Faith
Deaths from cancer in New Jersey
Deaths from pancreatic cancer
People from Cheraw, South Carolina
Musicians from South Carolina
Burials at Flushing Cemetery
20th-century Bahá'ís
20th-century African-American musicians
20th-century American composers
20th-century trumpeters
The Giants of Jazz members
The Cab Calloway Orchestra members
Discovery Records artists
20th-century American male musicians
20th-century jazz composers
CTI Records artists
Philips Records artists